Raising Dion is an American superhero drama streaming television series that premiered on October 4, 2019 on Netflix. It is based on the 2015 comic book and short film of the same name by Dennis Liu. In January 2020, Netflix renewed the series for a second and final season which premiered on February 1, 2022.

Premise
Raising Dion follows the story of a woman named Nicole who raises her son Dion after the death of her husband Mark. The normal dramas of raising a son as a single mom are amplified when Dion starts to manifest several magical, superhero-like abilities. Nicole must now keep her son's gifts secret with the help of Mark's best friend Pat, and protect Dion from people out to exploit him while figuring out the origin of his abilities.

Cast and characters

Main

 Alisha Wainwright as Nicole Warren, a widowed mother who is raising her son alone while trying to manage his supernatural abilities after the death of her husband
 Ja'Siah Young as Dion Warren,  Nicole's young, superpowered son
 Jazmyn Simon as Kat Neese, Nicole's older sister who is a surgeon.
 Sammi Haney as Esperanza Jimenez, Dion's classmate and best friend. She also has osteogenesis imperfecta (brittle bone disease).
 Jason Ritter as Pat Rollins, an engineer at a biotech company called BIONA, Mark's best friend and Dion's godfather. 
 Griffin Robert Faulkner as Brayden Mills (season 2, recurring season 1)
 Ali Ahn as Suzanne Wu (season 2, recurring season 1), a scientist and the CEO of BIONA

Recurring
 Michael B. Jordan as Mark Warren, a scientist and Nicole's deceased husband, who secretly was given superpowers by the aurora event in Iceland and is trapped as a spirit after having been absorbed by the Crooked Man
 Gavin Munn as Jonathan King, Dion's classmate and bully-turned-friend.
 Skyler Elyse Philpot as Steffi, Dion's classmate and popular skater kid
 Donald Paul as Mr. Anthony Fry, Dion's science teacher
 Matt Lewis as Mr. Campbell, Dion's school principal
 Marc Menchaca as Walter Mills, a farmer who is a superpowered man from the Iceland event. He is absorbed into the Crooked Man, leaving his son Brayden, who developed telepathy due to his father's own superpowers, alone.
 Moriah Brown as Willa
 Cade Tropeano as Dubious Boy, Dion's classmate and school show member
 Diana Chiritescu as Jill Noonan
 Kylen Davis as Malik, Nicole's teenage neighbor and Tessa's son
 Dana Gourrier as Tessa, Nicole's neighbor and Malik's mother
 J. Harrison Ghee as Kwame
 Deirdre Lovejoy as Charlotte Tuck, a woman saved by Mark in a storm. She is another woman with superpowers from the Iceland event.
 Josh Ventura as David Marsh (season 2), the new vice president of operations at BIONA
 Rome Flynn as Tevin Wakefield (season 2), Dion's new trainer at BIONA who has powers and Nicole's love interest
 Aubriana Davis as Janelle Carr (season 2), a 15-year-old who has trouble controlling her powers
 Michael Anthony as Gary Stafford (season 2), a security guard at Dion's school
 Tracey Bonner as Simone Carr (season 2), Janelle's mother

Episodes

Series overview

Season 1 (2019)

Season 2 (2022)

Production

Development
On October 5, 2017, it was announced that Netflix had given the production a straight-to-series order for a first season consisting of nine episodes. The series is based on the comic book of the same name written by Dennis Liu and illustrated by Jason Piperberg. Liu then directed a short film based on his comic. Carol Barbee adapted a screenplay from the short film and comic and is the showrunner for the series. Executive producers for the series were set to include Liu, Barbee, Michael B. Jordan, Charles D. King, Kim Roth, Poppy Hanks, Kenny Goodman, and Michael Green. Production companies involved with the series were slated to consist of Outlier Society Productions and MACRO. The series premiered on October 4, 2019. On January 2, 2020, Netflix renewed the series for an eight-episode second season, which was released on February 1, 2022. In April 2022, the series was canceled.

Casting
Alongside the initial announcement of the series order, it was confirmed that Michael B. Jordan had been cast in a supporting role in the series. In June 2018, it was announced that Jason Ritter, Jazmyn Simon, Alisha Wainwright, and Ja'Siah Young had been cast as a series regulars. In July 2018, Donald Paul was cast as a recurring role in the series. On January 29, 2019, it was reported that Ali Ahn had joined the cast in a recurring capacity. On February 23, 2021, Rome Flynn, Aubriana Davis, Tracey Bonner, and Josh Ventura joined the cast undisclosed capacities while Ali Ahn and Griffin Robert Faulkner were promoted to series regulars for the second season. On August 24, 2021, Michael Anthony joined the cast in a recurring role for the second season.

Filming
Principal photography for the series began in late July 2018 in various cities and towns in Georgia including Chattahoochee Hills and Fairburn. Filming continued in the same areas in August 2018 and also took place in Midtown Atlanta at locations including the Fox Theatre. Filming for the second season began on January 25, 2021 and concluded on May 25, 2021.

Reception
The review aggregation website Rotten Tomatoes reported an 83% approval rating for the series, based on 29 reviews, with an average rating of 6.8/10. The website's critics consensus reads, "While its family drama and superhero aspirations don't quite come together, compelling performances and a sense of wonder keep Raising Dion afloat and suggest that with a little more guidance it could become something great". On Metacritic, which uses a weighted average, the series was assigned a score of 61 out of 100 based on 7 critics, indicating "generally favorable reviews".

The second season was watched for over 108.75 million hours in its first 26 days on the platform according to Netflix top 10s.

Accolades
The show received six nominations at the 1st Children's and Family Emmy Awards: Outstanding Children's or Family Viewing Series, Outstanding Younger Performer in a Preschool, Children's or Young Teen Program (for Young and Haney), Outstanding Stunt Coordination for a Live Action Program, Outstanding Sound Mixing and Sound Editing for a Live Action Program and Outstanding Visual Effects for a Live Action Program.

Controversy 
In February 2022, artist Jason Piperberg posted a series to Tweets regarding the authorship of the show. In the thread, he states "Dennis [Lui] wrote the script. I did all the art, letters, and vast majority of book layout/file prep for the 1 and only issue of the comic. With that in mind, it seems pretty odd that only Dennis is credited when the show states that it's 'based on the comic book by' both of us."

References

External links
 
 

2010s American black television series
2010s American drama television series
2010s American science fiction television series
2019 American television series debuts
2022 American television series endings
2020s American black television series
2020s American drama television series
2020s American science fiction television series
English-language Netflix original programming
Fiction about superhuman features or abilities
American black superhero television shows
Child superheroes
Television series about families
Television series about children
Television series about widowhood
Television shows based on comics
Television shows filmed in Georgia (U.S. state)
Television shows set in Atlanta